My Night with Reg is a 1996 British film adapted from the Kevin Elyot play of the same title, and directed by Roger Michell.

Entirely set among London's gay community in the mid-1980s against the background of the mounting AIDS crisis, My Night with Reg follows the ups and downs of a circle of gay friends over a period of several years. One of the group, the Reg mentioned in the title, is not a character in the play but the whole plot revolves around his apparent promiscuity and the chain reaction of deception and betrayal set off by it.

Cast
 David Bamber as Guy
 Anthony Calf as John
 Joe Duttine as Eric
 Roger Frost as Bernie
 Kenneth MacDonald as Benny
 John Sessions as Daniel

External links 
 

1996 films
British LGBT-related films
Films directed by Roger Michell
Films set in the 20th century
British films based on plays
1990s English-language films
1990s British films